Brian McFadden is an Irish singer.

Brian McFadden may also refer to:

Brian McFadden (cartoonist)
Brian McFadden, character in Seven Brides for Seven Brothers (TV series)

See also
Brian MacFadyen, musician in The Vacant Lots
Brian McFadyen, on the Tasmania cricket team
Bryant McFadden, American football player